The  is a form of art bike indigenous to Japan dating back to the mid-1970s. "Deko" in Japanese is short for "decoration" and "chari" is slang for "bike". The dekochari was a response by children to the Dekotora ("tora" is short for "truck") craze which swept Japan after a series of movies called Truck Yaro was released. These movies featured giant trucks decked out in chrome and flashy lights.

Unable to drive the giant chrome-plated flashing trucks they coveted, children instead built plywood boxes around their bikes and attached chrome plating and lights. Almost all current Dekocharis have elaborate light displays and many include hi-fi audio systems and cup-holders.

There are currently several dekochari bike gangs in Japan, including the All Japan Hishyomaru fleet, the All Japan DC Club Ryumaki and the All Japan Kyokugenmaru Gang.

See also 
 Outline of cycling

References

External links
 Art Bicycle Factory
 Hishyomaru Dekochari Gang
 All Japan DC Club Ryuumaki
 Hokkaido Sukikan

Cycle types
Decorated vehicles

Cycling in Japan
Japanese art